Adults in the Room is a 2019 French-Greek political film directed by Costa-Gavras. It is based on the book Adults in the Room: My Battle with Europe's Deep Establishment by Yanis Varoufakis about the 2015 Greek bailout. It is Gavras' first feature film that was shot in Greece.

Plot
In 2015, following Syriza's victory in the 2015 Greek legislative election, Minister of Finance Yánis Varoufákis is tasked by Prime Minister Aléxis Tsípras to negotiate a new deal on the memorandum of understanding signed by previous government with the Troika in order to avoid facing another inevitable debt crisis in the country months later. However, throughout successive meetings of the Eurogroup, Varoufákis's proposals are only met with flat refusals from the Troika. With constant threats from the European institution of an eviction of Greece from the Eurozone if their demands are not met, Greek PM Aléxis Tsípras is forced to sign the MoU, going against the 62% of the population that rejected the bailouts by voting "No" in the 2015 Greek bailout referendum. Yánis Varoufákis then resigned, five months after taking the office.

Cast
 Chrístos Loúlis: Yánis Varoufákis
 Aléxandros Bourdoúmis: Aléxis Tsípras
 Ulrich Tukur: Wolfgang Schäuble
 Daan Schuurmans: Jeroen Dijsselbloem
 Dimítris Tárloou: Euclide Tsakalotos
 Josiane Pinson: Christine Lagarde
 Valeria Golino: Danái Strátou
 Aurélien Recoing: Pierre Moscovici
 Vincent Nemeth: Michel Sapin
 Francesco Acquaroli: Mario Draghi
 George Lenz: Head of the Troika
 Philip Schurer: George Osborne
 Damien Mougin: Emmanuel Macron
 Aléxandros Logothétis: Mános
 Chrístos Stérgioglou: Sákis
 Cornelius Obonya: Wims
 Thános Tokákis: Yórgos
 María Protópappa: Elena
 Thémis Pánou: Siágas
 Kostas Antalopoulos: press contact for Wolfgang Schäuble
 Skyrah Archer : Eurogroup secretary
 Marina Argyropolo: Fenia
 Georges Corraface: Greek ambassador to France
 Giannis Dalianis
 Adrian Frieling: Lithuanian minister of Finances

Release
The film was selected to play out of competition at the 76th Venice International Film Festival.

Reception
Jessica Kiang of Variety wrote, "Far too many adults, in far too many rooms, have far too many repetitive conversations about the arcane ins-and-outs of EU policymaking in Costa-Gavras’ maddeningly unfocused 'Adults in the Room.'"

Jordan Mintzer of The Hollywood Reporter wrote, "For those interested in how the EU sausage is made — a process that Costa-Gavras mines both for its theatricality and seeming inanity — the film can be a gripping piece of infotainment, even if it runs long at 124 minutes. Others may shy away from so many administrative details, but they will be missing out on a movie that tries to cut through all the red tape and explore the human travails behind the protocols."

References

External links
 

2019 films
2019 biographical drama films
Films about the European Union
Films based on non-fiction books
Films directed by Costa Gavras
Films set in the Great Recession
Films set in 2015
Films set in Athens
Films set in Berlin
Films set in Brussels
Films set in Frankfurt
Films set in Greece
Films set in London
Films set in Paris
Films set in Riga
Films shot in Paris
Films shot in Latvia
Films shot in Brussels
Films shot in Germany
Films shot in London
Films shot in Greece
Films shot in Berlin
French biographical drama films
Greek biographical drama films
2010s French-language films
2010s German-language films
2010s English-language films
English-language Greek films
2010s Greek-language films
2019 multilingual films
French multilingual films
Greek multilingual films
2010s French films
French political films